72 Hours is an American television reality competition series produced by Lighthearted Entertainment that premiered on Turner Network Television (TNT) on June 6, 2013. 72 Hours is hosted by actor and TV host Brandon Johnson who formerly co-starred as dance show host Gary Wilde on the Disney Channel original series Shake It Up. The series is executive produced by Howard Schultz, Brady Connell and Rob LaPlante. Jeff Spangler serves as the co-executive producer of the series.

In each episode of 72 Hours, three new competing teams of strangers are dropped in the complete wilderness where they are given very few essential items to survive. The teams must travel through harsh environments, such as dangerous wildlife or insect infestations for 72 hours to find a hidden briefcase that contains $100,000. The team that finds the briefcase is the winner of the competition and they receive the $100,000 cash prize.

Premise
Each episode in the series introduces new groups of strangers who are dropped off in a remote location. Each episode has a different location. For example, one episode takes place in the American Southwest and another episode takes place in the island of Hawaii. Once the teams are dropped at a location, they are supplied with only a single bottle of water and a GPS tracking device. The goal of the competition is to survive and travel through harsh and dangerous environments, such as dangerous wildlife or insect infestations to find a hidden briefcase containing $100,000. The team that finds the briefcase is the winner of the competition and they receive the $100,000 cash prize.

Episodes

Reception
72 Hours has received mixed reviews from critics. The series currently has a score of 48 out of 100 on Metacritic, citing mixed or average reviews. Entertainment Weekly critic Adam Carlson stated "Like other snackable television like this, 72 Hours isn't afraid of delivering everything you want, including not just a few reality competition tropes — but all of them."

The show was awarded 3 stars by Common Sense Media reviewer Melissa Camacho. Melissa praised that "the show's primary focus on the actual race, rather than personal drama, makes it a fun viewing choice."

References

External links

 
 

2010s American reality television series
2013 American television series debuts
2013 American television series endings
2010s American game shows
English-language television shows
TNT (American TV network) original programming
Television game shows with incorrect disambiguation